Nariman Yuryevich Gusalov (born 22 May 1990) is a Russian former professional football player.

Club career
He previously played for FC Alania Vladikavkaz. He made his Russian Premier League debut for FC Alania Vladikavkaz on 15 October 2010 in a game against Spartak Moscow.

External links

References

1990 births
Sportspeople from Vladikavkaz
Living people
Russian footballers
Association football defenders
Russian Premier League players
FC Spartak Vladikavkaz players
Expatriate footballers in Latvia
Russian expatriate footballers
FC Avangard Kursk players
FC Smena Komsomolsk-na-Amure players
FC Nosta Novotroitsk players